Nutone may refer to:
Nutone Records, a Canadian record label
Nu:Tone, an English drum and bass musician
NuTone, an American manufacturer of residential electric and electronic products
Number unobtainable tone (also known as NU tone), a telephony signal